Katase is a village in Alutaguse Parish, Ida-Viru County, in northeastern Estonia. It's located on the northern shore of Lake Peipus. Katase has a population of 49 (as of 2011).

Katase was first mentioned in 1419.

References

Villages in Ida-Viru County